Meshkov may refer to:

Meshkov (surname)
HC Meshkov Brest, a handball club from Brest, Belarus
Richtmyer–Meshkov instability in fluids